is a Japanese manga artist. She is best known for her Dōbutsu no Oisha-san series.

Selected works
 Apron Complex (Epuron Kompurekksu), 1980
 Peppermint Spy (Pepaminto Supai), 1985–1987
 Dōbutsu no Oisha-san, 1988–1993 (became a TV drama in 2003)
 Otanko Nurse (Otanko Nāsu), 1995–1998
 Heaven?, 1999–2003
 Tsukidate no Satsujin, 2005–2006
 Channel wa sono mama!, 2008–2013 (became a TV drama in 2019)

References

External links

1961 births
Living people
Manga artists